Battle of Faenza may refer to:

 Battle of Faventia (82 BC), fought between opposing Roman factions
 Battle of Faenza (490), fought between the Kingdom of Italy and the Ostrogoths
 Battle of Faventia (542), fought between the Ostrogoths and the Byzantine Empire
 Siege of Faenza (1239), led by Emperor Frederick II against the Guelph–controlled city
 Battle of Faenza (1797), fought between the French First Republic and the Papal States